Radoslav Suslekov (born 13 July 1974) is a boxer from Bulgaria.

He was born in Burgas. At the 1996 Summer Olympics he was stopped in the first round of the Light welterweight (63.5 kg) division by Iran's Babak Moghimi. Suslekov had won bronze medals in the same division earlier, at the 1995 World Amateur Boxing Championships and the 1996 European Amateur Boxing Championships.

References

1974 births
Living people
Welterweight boxers
Boxers at the 1996 Summer Olympics
Olympic boxers of Bulgaria
Sportspeople from Burgas
Bulgarian male boxers
AIBA World Boxing Championships medalists